Martin Hinterstocker may refer to:

Martin Hinterstocker (ice hockey, born 1954), bronze medalist at the 1976 Winter Olympics for West Germany
Martin Hinterstocker (ice hockey, born 1989), participated 2007 IIHF World U18 Championships for Germany